What You've Done was an EP released by New Zealand singer/songwriter Tim Finn.

Referred to as a single in a lot of cases, it was released to support the album Feeding The Gods. It contains the ALT recording of What You've Done as well as the original track, & some supporting live tracks.

Track listing
 All songs composed by Tim Finn unless noted

"What You've Done" (album version) - Tim Finn, Andy White & Liam O'Moanlai
"What You've Done" (ALT version) - Tim Finn, Andy White & Liam O'Moanlai
"Persuasion" (Acoustic version) - Tim Finn, Richard Thompson
"Six Months In A Leaky Boat" (Live at the Borderline, London. 16 June 1993) - Tim Finn, Split Enz
"Charlie" (with Phil Manzanera)
"I See Red" (with Regurgitator)
"What You've Done" (video for use in computers) - Tim Finn, Andy White & Liam O'Moanlai

Tim Finn albums
2001 EPs